George Anthony Yarno (August 12, 1957 – August 8, 2016) was a professional football player, a guard for ten seasons in the National Football League with Tampa Bay, Atlanta, and Houston. He also played two seasons with the Denver Gold of the USFL.

Yarno worked as an offensive line coach for a number of collegiate and professional teams. After his release from the Detroit Lions following the 2012 season, Yarno accepted the offensive line coach job with the Jacksonville Jaguars in 2013.

Early years 
Born and raised in Spokane, Washington, Yarno was one of six children; his mother Wanda died in 1962 when he was just five. His older brother John (b. 1954) was an All-American center at Idaho, and later a five-year starter in the NFL for the Seattle Seahawks.

George attended Gonzaga Preparatory School as a freshman, then spent two years in Alaska with his father and went to East Anchorage High School.  He returned to Spokane and attended Ferris for his senior year, graduated in 1975, then played four years at Washington State University in Pullman under four head coaches (Jim Sweeney, Jackie Sherrill, Warren Powers, and Jim Walden), as a nose tackle and defensive tackle. He matched up often with his brother John in the Battle of the Palouse in 1975 and 1976, both games handily won by WSU at

Professional playing career
Unselected in the 1979 NFL Draft, Yarno was signed by the Tampa Bay Buccaneers as a rookie free agent in 1979 and made the team on the other side of the ball, as a reserve offensive lineman. He was a starting offensive lineman a majority of his career, including starts at tackle, guard, and center.

Scoring
Despite being an offensive lineman, Yarno scored one point in his NFL career, an extra point in the closing moments of the 1983 season at Detroit on December 18, indoors at the Pontiac Silverdome.  As the team's emergency kicker, the straight-on left-footed Yarno entered the game with 77 seconds to play and down by four points.  Head coach John McKay had removed the newly signed placekicker, barefooted Dave Warnke, after two consecutive poor kicks: a failed extra point late in the first half and an unattractive low spinning field goal attempt in the third quarter from 29 yards, when the score was tied at 13. Following Yarno's successful conversion, heartily celebrated by his fellow linemen, division champion Detroit recovered the subsequent onside kick and ran out the clock to win the game by three points, 23–20, and hapless Tampa Bay finished the year at 2–14.

Coaching career

College assistant
Following his career as a player, Yarno entered the coaching ranks as a collegiate assistant at Washington State University; he coached the offensive line for four seasons under head coach Mike Price, from 1991 to 1994. After three seasons in Moscow, Yarno left for the University of Houston in 1998 to become the assistant head coach (and offensive line coach) under head coach Kim Helton. In 2000, he was the offensive line coach for Arizona State University for a season, Bruce Snyder's last as head coach, then spent two seasons at LSU under head coach Nick Saban, again as offensive line coach. He returned to Washington State in 2003 to coach the offensive line under first-year head coach Bill Doba; following Doba's dismissal after the 2007 season, Yarno became a coach at the professional level.

NFL assistant
Yarno became an NFL assistant coach in 2008 as the assistant offensive line coach with Tampa Bay, his first professional team as a player. After a season in Tampa, Yarno joined the coaching staff of the Detroit Lions in 2009 as offensive line coach.  He was recommended by offensive coordinator Scott Linehan, a former Idaho quarterback, whom Yarno had been recommended to by Nick Saban. Following a disappointing 4-12 season from the Detroit Lions after making the playoffs the year prior, Yarno was released as an assistant coach after the 2012 season. He was named the Jaguars offensive line coach on January 24, 2013. On January 20, 2015, the Jacksonville Jaguars hired former Buffalo Bills head coach Doug Marrone replacing Yarno as offensive line coach. Marrone's hiring means offensive line coach George Yarno will not return to the Jaguars in 2015, according to a team spokesman. The Jaguars announced on May 29, 2015 that Yarno had been diagnosed with cancer (stomach) and was receiving treatment. He remained under contract. Yarno died in Spokane at age 58 on August 8, 2016.

References

External links
 Jacksonville Jaguars - George Yarno - offensive line coach

 Video of Yarno kicking a PAT in 1983
 
 

1957 births
2016 deaths
Players of American football from Spokane, Washington
Tampa Bay Buccaneers players
Atlanta Falcons players
Houston Oilers players
Denver Gold players
Washington State Cougars football players
Washington State Cougars football coaches
Idaho Vandals football coaches
Houston Cougars football coaches
Arizona State Sun Devils football coaches
LSU Tigers football coaches
Tampa Bay Buccaneers coaches
Detroit Lions coaches
Jacksonville Jaguars coaches
Deaths from stomach cancer
Deaths from cancer in Washington (state)